is a Japanese professional drifting driver, currently competing in the D1 Grand Prix series for Team TOYO TIRES DRIFT.

Biography 
Kawabata first received his license at 18 and at that point he bought the Nissan 180SX. He practiced alone until he met late D1 driver Atsushi Kuroi who started to teach and advise Kawabata. At age 19, Kawabata entered a drift magazine sponsored contest and took first place. At 21, GP Sports started to sponsor Kawabata with a full line of aero parts and later he work for them moving from his hometown to Niigata where GP Sports based. Kawabata and first appeared in the D1 Grand Prix in round 4 of 2002.

In 2007 he did even better however winning two rounds and the overall title by one point over Nobushige Kumakubo.

In 2008 he change his car to 180SX in second round in Fuji which he drove until 2013 where he win his second title

In 2014 TRUST return and collaborate with Toyo Tires and he started to participate in D1GP with Nissan GT-R in 2014 and also left GP Sports in same year. The following year the Kawabata clinched his third D1GP title in penultimate round.

2016 was difficult year for him as Daigo Saito went to dominate the series. Despite able to beat Saito in exhibition event he went winless for the second time in 3 years and he finished the season 2nd in standings. He also started his own shop called True Man Racing (True Man is rough english translation of his name) and collaborating with fellow D1 driver Hideyuki Fujino they released a bodykit for Nissan 180SX called Kick Blue.

Following the defeat from previous year Trust built Kawabata new GT-R for 2017 season while his previous car was driven by returning Masao Suenaga, Toyo Tires as tires sponsor also released new Proxes R888R for competition. He win the third round in Tsukuba which his only win in the season, he end the season 5th in standings. But in same year he became the first driver to win FIA Intercontinental Drift Championship held in Odaiba which is first ever drift event held by FIA.

In 2018 Kawabata win 6 straight Solo Run creating a new record but unfortunately in Battle Run he failed to win a single run and lost the D1GP title to Masashi Yokoi.

In 2019, following Trust withdrawal he competing in the D1GP with Toyota GR Supra and became the first person to win D1GP round with it the following year. Unfortunately his performance keep getting worse as season goes. He change his car to new Toyota GR86 in 2022 built by his teammate Hideyuki Fujino where he gave GR86 first ever win in Drift competition, finished the season as runner-up claiming two wins and the Solo Run champions.

2007 Fuji Speedway accident
In , at round 2, held in Fuji Speedway, during a sudden death round against Daigo Saito, Saito dipped into the inner apex of the 300R corner and jumped the curb of the track. His car's front wheels lost traction, which resulted in the car to understeer and collect Kawabata's Silvia into the tyre barrier in the process, effectively destroying both cars.

The impact between the cars and when they were hurled into the track protection barrier happened at speeds of over 150 km/h. Kawabata immediately come out from his car but fell to the ground just as he walk out and had to be taken to hospital for treatment for whiplash injuries, Saito miraculously evaded any physical damages. the

Kawabata won the battle which he was unable to continue, leaving Atsushi Kuroi without an opponent. For the following round, he returned with a new car and took the win at the next round at Sportsland SUGO.

Complete Drifting Results

D1 Grand Prix

Russian Drift Series GP

References

External links
JDM Option
Employer's site
D1 Supporter profile
Driver Profile

Japanese racing drivers
Drifting drivers
1977 births
Living people
D1 Grand Prix drivers